CSK ZSU Stadium is a multi-use stadium in Kyiv, Ukraine. 

It is often used for football matches and was the home of FC CSKA Kyiv. The stadium holds 12,000 spectators and it opened in 1967. It is located next to the headquarters of the Ministry of Defense. The stadium is part of a bigger complex that also includes a swimming pool, athletic hall, and an area for summer cinema theater (outdoor cinema, currently inoperational). The stadium is also closely located to the city's main train station Kyiv Passenger.

In the close vicinity there is the Lokomotyv sports complex.

Gallery

External links
Stadium information
Stadium information (Official website)

1967 establishments in Ukraine
Football venues in Kyiv
FC CSKA Kyiv
FC Arsenal Kyiv
Sports venues in Kyiv
Solomianskyi District